William Vansittart Bowater (15 March 1838 – 28 April 1907) was the founder of Bowater, which became one of the world's largest producers of newspaper print. Today it had been broken up into a series of market-leading paper-based products business, including  packaging business Rexam.

Career
Having trained as a manager with James Wrigley in print paper manufacturing in Manchester, Bowater decided to establish himself in business as a paper agent in 1881. The business expanded rapidly in the final decades of the nineteenth century, supplying newsprint for both the Daily Mail and the Daily Chronicle.

Bowater married Eliza Jane Davey in 1861 and they went on to have nine children, including Sir Vansittart Bowater and Sir Frank Bowater, both of whom were to become Lord Mayor of London.

They lived at Bury Hall in Edmonton north of London.

References

1838 births
1907 deaths
19th-century English businesspeople